Suide County is a county of Yulin, Shaanxi, China, bordering Shanxi province across the Yellow River to the southeast.

Administrative divisions
As 2019, Suide County is divided to 15 towns. 
Towns

Climate

Transportation

China National Highway 210
China National Highway 307
Wuding Expressway
Taizhongyin Railway
Shenyan Railway

Notes and references

County-level divisions of Shaanxi
Yulin, Shaanxi